Yaiza is a small town in the island of Lanzarote in the Canary Islands, Spain. It lies in the southwest of the island. The population in 2012 was 857.  The town gives its name to the municipality of Yaiza, although it is much smaller than the largest settlement in the municipality, Playa Blanca.

The town has a town hall, tree-lined streets, and a floodlit public football stadium.

Each year, at Christmas, Yaiza displays a large "Belén" (a belén is a nativity scene). The Yaiza Belén includes miniaturised scenes from around the island, with miniatures of Playa Blanca, Arrecife, and Timanfaya. Children and visitors are encouraged to seek the caganer, a figurine of a young man defecating, as it is considered good luck to spot him.

Highway LZ2 connects the town to Playa Blanca in the south and Arrecife to the east.

References

External links 
  (in Spanish)

Populated places in Lanzarote